Fabienne Ficher (born 25 April 1966 in Paris) is a retired French athlete who specialised in the 400 meters. She competed at the 1988 Summer Olympics as well as one outdoor and five indoor World Championships.

International competitions

Personal bests
Outdoor
100 metres – 11.62 (+1.1 m/s, Montgeron 1996)
200 metres – 23.29 (+2.0 m/s, Montgeron 1998)
400 metres – 51.81 (Tours 1988)
Indoor
60 metres – 7.27 (Eaubonne 1999)
200 metres – 23.20 (Liévin 1999)
400 metres – 53.17 (Liévin 1988)

See also
French records in athletics
:Category:French athletes

References

All-Athletics profile

External links

French female sprinters
Olympic athletes of France
Living people
1966 births
Athletes (track and field) at the 1988 Summer Olympics
Athletes from Paris
Mediterranean Games gold medalists for France
Mediterranean Games silver medalists for France
Mediterranean Games medalists in athletics
Athletes (track and field) at the 1991 Mediterranean Games
Olympic female sprinters
20th-century French women
21st-century French women